Annapolis is a provincial electoral district in Nova Scotia, Canada, that elects one member of the Nova Scotia House of Assembly.

The district was created in 1867 and was abolished in 1953 when it was re-distributed into Annapolis East and Annapolis West.  The district was re-formed in 1993 and its boundaries were changed following the 2012 electoral reform commission to include the portion of Digby-Annapolis within Annapolis County north of Maitland Bridge.

The district includes the entirety of Annapolis County including the municipalities of Annapolis Royal and Middleton.

Since 2021, the district has been represented by Carman Kerr.

Geography
The electoral district of Annapolis has  of landmass.

Members of the Legislative Assembly
The electoral district has been represented by the following Members of the Legislative Assembly:

Election results

1867 general election

1871 general election

1874 general election

1878 general election

1882 general election

1886 general election

1890 general election

1894 general election

1896 special election

1897 general election

1901 general election

1906 general election

1911 general election

1916 general election

1920 general election

1925 general election

1928 general election

1933 general election

1937 general election

1941 general election

1945 general election

1949 general election

1953 general election

1993 general election

1998 general election

1999 general election

2003 general election

2006 general election

2009 general election

2013 general election 

|-
 
|Liberal
|Stephen McNeil
|align="right"|7,710
|align="right"|75.88
|align="right"|+2.56
|-
 
|Progressive Conservative
|Virginia Hurlock
|align="right"|1,390
|align="right"|13.68
|align="right"|+2.63
|-
 
|New Democratic Party
|Henry Spurr
|align="right"|834
|align="right"|8.21
|align="right"|-5.17
|-

|}

2017 general election

2021 general election

References

Elections Nova Scotia, Complete Results and Statistics (May 25, 1993). Retrieved December 1, 2013
Elections Nova Scotia, Complete Results and Statistics (March 24, 1998). Retrieved December 1, 2013
Elections Nova Scotia, Complete Results and Statistics (July 27, 1999). Retrieved December 1, 2013
Elections Nova Scotia, Complete Results and Statistics (August 5, 2003). Retrieved December 1, 2013
Elections Nova Scotia, Complete Results and Statistics (June 13, 2006). Retrieved December 1, 2013
Summary Results from 1867 to 2011

External links
 CBC: 2013 riding profile

Nova Scotia provincial electoral districts
Middleton, Nova Scotia